Biotin Carboxyl Carrier Protein (BCCP) refers to proteins containing a biotin attachment domain that carry biotin and carboxybiotin throughout the ATP-dependent carboxylation by biotin-dependent carboxylases. In the case of E. coli Acetyl-CoA carboxylase, the BCCP is a separate protein known as accB. On the other hand, in Haloferax mediterranei Propionyl-CoA carboxylase, the BCCP pccA is fused with biotin carboxylase.

Coenzymes
Enzymes
Metabolism
Proteins